Gertrude Tonkonogy Friedberg (17 March 1908 – September 17, 1989) was an American playwright and writer.

Life and career
Gertrude Tonkonogy was born in New York in 1908 as one of 11 children.  Her siblings included Eugene Tonkonogy; George T. Delacorte, Jr. was a half-brother.

After graduating from Barnard College with a B.A. in 1929, Tonkonogy made her first professional sale with the play Three Cornered Moon which was produced on Broadway (opening March 16, 1933) and starred Ruth Gordon and Brian Donlevy.  It was almost immediately made into a film of the same name starring Claudette Colbert; the film opened in August 1933.

Shortly after her success with the play, Tonkonogy married Charles K. Friedberg, a doctor.  She was thereafter credited as Gertrude Friedberg. Her second play, Town House, appeared in 1948.  It was based on stories by John Cheever, and directed by George S. Kaufman.

She wrote several short stories through the 1950s, publishing in the magazines New World Writing, Esquire, The Atlantic, Story and The Magazine of Fantasy & Science Fiction. Friedberg's first—and only—collection was in 1959 in the new writer showcase Short Story 2; this volume featured five of her stories, as well as stories from three other authors including Michael Rumaker. Between 1958 and 1972, Friedberg published three science fiction stories, and one science fiction novel, The Revolving Boy (1966). The Encyclopedia of Science Fiction characterizes the novel as a "minor classic in the field." It would be Friedberg's only novel.

According to the back page of an edition of The Revolving Boy published in 1980, Friedberg lived in New York, where she taught mathematics. Friedberg had two children, Richard and Barbara.  She died of cancer in her Manhattan home, aged 81.

References

External links
 

1908 births
1989 deaths
American women dramatists and playwrights
20th-century American dramatists and playwrights
20th-century American women writers
Barnard College alumni